Ogastemma is a monotypic genus of flowering plants belonging to the family Boraginaceae. The only species is Ogastemma pusillum.

Its native range is Canary Islands, Southern and Eastern Mediterranean to Mauritania, Arabian Peninsula.

References

Boraginoideae
Boraginaceae genera
Monotypic asterid genera